Leavenworth is a city in Chelan County, Washington, United States. It is part of the Wenatchee−East Wenatchee Metropolitan Statistical Area. The population was 2,263 at the 2020 census. The entire town center is modeled on a German Bavarian village as part of a civic initiative that began in the 1960s. The area is a major, four-season tourist destination with festivals nearly every month and a multitude of events year round.

History

The construction of the Great Northern Railway through the Tumwater Canyon in 1892 brought settlers to a townsite that was named "Leavenworth". Lafayette Lamb arrived in 1903 from Clinton, Iowa, to build the second largest sawmill in Washington state.

Leavenworth was officially incorporated on September 5, 1906. A small timber community, it became a regional office of the Great Northern Railway in the early 1900s. The railroad relocated to Wenatchee in 1925, greatly affecting Leavenworth's economy. The city's population declined well into the 1950s as the lumber mills closed and stores relocated.

The city looked to tourism and recreation as a major economy as early as 1929, when they opened a ski jump. In 1962, the Project LIFE (Leavenworth Improvement For Everyone) Committee was formed in partnership with the University of Washington to investigate strategies to revitalize the struggling logging town. The theme town idea was created by two Seattle businessmen, Ted Price and Bob Rodgers, who had bought a failing cafe on Highway 2 in 1960. Price was chair of the Project LIFE tourism subcommittee, and in 1965 the pair led a trip to a Danish-themed town, Solvang, California, to build support for the idea. The first building to be remodeled in the Bavarian style was the Chikamin Hotel, which owner LaVerne Peterson renamed the Edelweiss after the state flower of Bavaria.

Geography

Geology

Leavenworth sits on the southeast side of the North Cascades collage, which is a group of terranes that accreted to North America all about the same time. Marine fossils indicate that the terranes were probably a group of islands originating in the South Pacific hundreds of million years ago. The terranes arrived at North America about 90 million years ago in the middle of the Cretaceous period. When they smashed into their new home, they were a puzzle of north–south slices.  As accretion continued, they were cut into horizontal (east-west) slices.

During the Eocene epoch, about 50 million years ago, the area was once again cut into vertical slices, creating among others, the Leavenworth fault and the Entiat fault.  In between these two faults the Chiwaukum graben was created. This graben is about 12 miles wide and trends northwest from Wenatchee for about 50 miles. As the graben dropped, it began to fill with clastic sediment from the surrounding hills, creating the Chumstick formation.  About 30 million years ago in the Oligocene epoch, the Chiwaukum graben underwent compressional deformation creating several folds in the region that are visible today. Leavenworth is on the western edge of the graben; in fact, the Leavenworth fault runs through the western edge of town. The area to the west and southwest of Leavenworth was created in the middle Cretaceous period with the uplift of the Mount Stuart batholith, forming the granite rock seen today in Icicle Ridge and Tumwater Mountain.

During the Pleistocene and into the Holocene epochs, an alpine glacier originating from the southwest in the Mount Stuart range made its way to where the town is today. Leavenworth sits on the terminal moraine of that glacier. The residential parts of town display many glacial erratics that originated 20 miles up the Icicle Valley near Mount Stuart.

About 19,000 years ago, a large rock slide dammed the Columbia River near Rock Island, just south of Wenatchee. The temporary dam, in conjunction with one of the Lake Missoula floods, caused the water to flow back up the Wenatchee Valley, where it was stopped by the glacier at Leavenworth.  As the leading edge of the glacier interacted with the flood, ice rafts formed carrying granite erratics from the Stuart batholith, which ended up in the town of Dryden about 15 miles down the valley from Leavenworth. As the glacier retreated, the south side of Leavenworth was a lake dammed up by the moraine. The bridge on the east side of town is a good vantage point to see where the Wenatchee River cuts through the moraine today.

Climate
Leavenworth has a continental Mediterranean climate (Köppen Dsb) with summers characterized by hot, sunny days and chilly nights, and cold, snowy winters.

During the summer, the weather is typically anticyclonic due to the presence of the North Pacific anticyclone, with resultant clear skies and large diurnal temperature ranges. Rainfall is limited by the Cascade rain shadow as well as by the anticyclone, and all months from May to October have recorded zero precipitation on occasions, including 114 consecutive days without precipitation from June to October 2003. When a continental flow enters the Columbia Basin, the temperature can be very hot during the day, with the hottest temperature being  during the heatwave of July 1941. However, on cooler, stiller days, summer nights can still be cold and frosts have been recorded as early as August 29 in 1980.

The spring months see gradual warming and drying, though frosts remain frequent well into the start of April. During an average year, over 168 mornings see temperatures fall to freezing or below. May 16 is the average date of last freeze; 2016 was the first year to record a last frost in March.

Demographics

As of the 2010 U.S. Census, there were 1,965 people, 908 households, and 500 families residing in the city. The racial makeup of the city was 92.9% White, 0.4% Black, 0.5% Native American, 0.6% Asian, 0.2% Pacific Islander, 3.9% from other races, and 1.6% from two or more races. Hispanic or Latino of any race were 10.8% of the population.

There were 908 households, of which about 24% had children under the age of 18 living with them, about 42% were married couples living together, about 10% had a female householder with no husband present, 3% had a male householder with no wife present, and about 45% were non-families. About 37% of all households were made up of individuals, and about 20% had someone living alone who was 65 years of age or older. The average household size was 2.16 and the average family size was 2.84.

The median age in the city was about 42 years. About 20% of residents were under the age of 18; about 8% were between the ages of 18 and 24; 25% were from 25 to 44; about 27% were from 45 to 64; and about 20% were 65 years of age or older. The gender makeup of the city was 46.7% male and 53.3% female.

Culture

Leavenworth was designed with an Alpine German theme from the 1960s onward, with most buildings modeled after Bavarian settlements and adopting stereotypical fonts and names. However the town retains wide streets and large parking lots which are untypical of Bavaria. The Bavarianization of the town waned by the 1990s but was revived through the establishment of annual events, including an Oktoberfest begun in 1998. The Oktoberfest was later cancelled in 2020 and 2021 due to the COVID-19 pandemic before being moved to Wenatchee for 2022. Leavenworth's transformation into a theme town was inspired, and assisted, by Solvang, California. Later, the Washington town of Winthrop followed Leavenworth's example and adopted a Western town theme.

Leavenworth is home to the Leavenworth Nutcracker Museum, which opened in 1995 and contains more than 5,000 nutcrackers dating from prehistoric to modern.  Leavenworth hosts an annual Oktoberfest celebration.

In November 2007, Good Morning America went to Leavenworth for Holiday Gifts for the Globe where GMA helped light up the town for the Christmas Holiday. Leavenworth was named the Ultimate Holiday Town USA by A&E Network.

Education

Public schools in Leavenworth and the surrounding area are operated by the Cascade School District, which has over 1,300 students. The district has one high school, located in Leavenworth, that was rebuilt in 2019.

Leavenworth is home to the Upper Valley Christian School, which is a private, K-12 school operated by the Leavenworth Church of the Nazarene.

Infrastructure

Transportation
Leavenworth is located on U.S. Route 2, which continues west across Stevens Pass to Snohomish County and east towards Wenatchee. The Chumstick Highway, formerly known as State Route 209, travels north from Leavenworth to Plain and Lake Wenatchee State Park.

The city is served by Amtrak's Empire Builder train, which stops daily at Icicle Station near downtown. Link Transit provides local and inter-city public transit services that connect Leavenworth to Wenatchee, as well as local paratransit and a downtown shuttle. The city also has several private taxi companies and inter-city bus operators, including stops for Northwestern Trailways and Amtrak Thruway Motorcoach.

See also
 Tudorbethan architecture
 Helen, Georgia
 Frankenmuth, Michigan
 Solvang, California

References

Further reading

Generalized geologic map of the Chelan 1:100,000 quadrangle
Swauk Formation (Caroline J. Cloudas, 1998)
Field Trip Guide: Geology and Art
Chiwaukum Schist in the Nason Terrane (Jessy Ryan)
A geological trip along Snoqualmie, Swauk, and Stevens Pass Highways. Washington state geology department, 1963
Northwest Exposures. David Alt and Donald W. Hyndman
Roadside Geology of Washington. David Alt and Donald W. Hyndman
Genealogy of Chelan County. Wayne and Linda McGahuey

External links

 
 City of Leavenworth website
 Leavenworth Chamber of Commerce
 

Cities in Washington (state)
Cities in Chelan County, Washington
German communities in the United States
Wenatchee–East Wenatchee metropolitan area
Populated places established in 1906
1906 establishments in Washington (state)